Loop recorder may refer to:
Digital loop recorder, a type of closed-circuit television security camera
Implantable loop recorder, a medical diagnostic device